"I Wish Grandpas Never Died" is a song co-written and recorded by American country music singer Riley Green. It is the third single from his debut studio album Different 'Round Here.

History
Green had written the song and performed it on tour before adding it to the tracklist of his debut album. According to him, he was persuaded to record the song by Brad Paisley. The song caused waves on country radio, for the lyric "I wish country music still got played on country radio." A radio edit was created to edit out the jab towards pop country, and the lyric was replaced with "I wish George Jones still got played on country radio."

The song is a tribute to Green's grandfathers, both of whom are also credited as co-writers on the song.

Commercial performance
The song has sold 123,000 copies in the United States as of March 2020.

Charts

Weekly charts

Year-end charts

Certifications

References

2019 songs
2019 singles
Riley Green (singer) songs
Big Machine Records singles
Song recordings produced by Dann Huff